The spottail chub (Algansea tincella) is a species of freshwater fish in the family Cyprinidae, endemic to the Lerma–Chapala basin and upper Santa Maria (Tampoán) system  in west-central Mexico. Populations of the Ameca River basin were formerly included in this species, but are now recognized as A. amecae.

There are some minor local variations in the appearance of A. tincella, but they all have a dark spot at the base of the tail.

References

Algansea
Fish described in 1844
Freshwater fish of Mexico
Endemic fish of Mexico